Wonk may refer to:

 Wonky (genre), an experimental genre of electronic music
 Wonk (character), a character from The Adventures of Wonk by Muriel Levy
 Wonk, in the List of Bobobo-bo Bo-bobo characters
 Wonk FM, an American radio service serving the Washington, D.C., area on WWDC-HD2 (101.1) and W284CQ (104.7)

See also
 Wonkette, an American online magazine
 Wonky (disambiguation)